Jesús María Rojas Alou (March 24, 1942 – March 10, 2023) was a Dominican professional baseball outfielder. During a 15-year Major League Baseball (MLB) career, he played for the San Francisco Giants (1963–68), the Houston Astros (1969–73; 1978–79), the Oakland Athletics (1973–74), and the New York Mets (1975). He was the youngest of a trio of baseball-playing brothers that included Felipe and Matty.

Playing career
Alou was considered a better prospect than either of his brothers and received a $4,000 signing bonus from the San Francisco Giants. He made his major league debut with the Giants late in the 1963 season. In his first game, on September 10, all three Alou brothers batted in the same inning (they were retired in order). Five days later, for the first time, the three played in the outfield for the Giants at the same time.

In 1964, his first full year in the major leagues, Alou batted .274 with little power, but on July 10, he went 6-for-6 with five singles and a home run. Alou was selected by the Montreal Expos in the 1968 MLB expansion draft and then was traded to the Houston Astros with Donn Clendenon for Rusty Staub. In the 1970 season, Alou hit .306 in 487 at-bats, with a career-best 21 walks, but little power (only 1 homerun).

With the emergence of younger players in the Astros' outfield such as Bob Watson and Cesar Cedeño, Alou was no longer a regular outfielder after the 1971 season. As a reserve outfielder and pinch-hitter, he hit .312 in 52 games in the 1972 season. On July 31, 1973, the Astros traded Alou to the Oakland Athletics for a player to be named later. He served as a bench player for the Athletics on two World Series championship teams. Alou was released by the Athletics towards the end of March 1975, before the start of the  season, and he signed with the New York Mets on April 10. He batted .265 as a pinch hitter for the Mets, and they released Alou before the 1976 season. In 1976, Alou played for Córdoba of the Mexican League. He responded by hitting .324 in part-time action and became a player-coach the following year before retiring.

Post-playing career
Alou later served as a scout for the Expos, then moved to the Florida Marlins as the club's director of Dominican operations. He held the same post with the Boston Red Sox from  through , then moved to a part-time role as special assistant and then ambassador to the Red Sox' international scouting and player development department through 2020.

Alou was awarded the Hispanic Heritage Baseball Museum Hall of Fame Pioneer Award at a pre-game ceremony at Minute Maid Park, on September 23, 2008.

Personal life
Alou married Angela Hanley. They had five children and lived in the Dominican Republic.

Alou died on March 10, 2023, at age 80.

See also
Alou family
List of Major League Baseball players from the Dominican Republic
List of Major League Baseball single-game hits leaders

References

External links

Retrosheet

1942 births
2023 deaths
Jesus
Artesia Giants players
Boston Red Sox scouts
Dominican Republic expatriate baseball players in Canada
Dominican Republic expatriate baseball players in the United States
Dominican Republic people of Catalan descent
El Paso Sun Kings players
Eugene Emeralds players
Hastings Giants players
Houston Astros coaches
Houston Astros players
Houston Astros scouts
Leones del Caracas players
Dominican Republic expatriate baseball players in Venezuela
Leones del Escogido players
Major League Baseball left fielders
Major League Baseball players from the Dominican Republic
Major League Baseball right fielders
Miami Marlins scouts
Montreal Expos scouts
New York Mets players
Oakland Athletics players
People from Bajos de Haina
Phoenix Giants players
San Francisco Giants players
Tacoma Giants players